The IMANI Center for Policy and Education is a think tank based in Accra, Ghana. As a member of the Atlas Economic Research Foundation, the think tank applies free market solutions to intricate domestic social problems.

History
It was founded in 2004 by Franklin Cudjoe, who currently serves as the president and chief executive officer.

Operations
The think tank's operations center on these four thematic areas: rule of law, market growth and development, individual rights, and human security and institutional development. IMANI uses the Africanliberty.org platform as a springboard to reach out to the larger African audience in five international languages, including Swahili.
IMANI exerts influence in the Ghanaian public education and policy sphere through media appearances, publications, research, and seminars.

Leadership 
Franklin Cudjoe - President

Bright Simons - Vice President (in charge of research)

Kofi Bentil - Vice President

Recognition
The think tank is ranked by the Global Go To Think Tanks and Civil Societies Program, organized annually by the University of Pennsylvania. According to the 2009 Index Report, IMANI was ranked fifth most influential in Sub-Saharan Africa, and the only African think tank to make the list of top 25 "Most Innovative" across the world.

Funding 

IMANI is funded through donations from individuals and foundations. In 2008, the think tank won the $100,000 Anthony Fisher Venture Grant.

References

External links 
 "Africanliberty.org"/IMANI Receives $100,000 Grant from the Atlas Economic Research Foundation, 25 March, 2008
IMANI official website 
 "Go To Think Tank"/The Think Tanks and Civil Societies Program official website, 22 April, 2014

Think tanks based in Ghana
Non-profit organisations based in Ghana
Think tanks established in 2004
Organizations established in 2004